John Edmond (born 1936) is a Rhodesian folk singer.

John Edmond or Edmund may also refer to:

John M. Edmond (1943–2001), professor of marine geochemistry and oceanography
Johnny Edmond (born 1969), footballer
John ab Edmund, Welsh politician

See also
John Edmonds (disambiguation)
John Edmunds (disambiguation)
John Edmondson (disambiguation)